The 1919–20 season was Madrid Football Club's 18th season in existence. The club played some friendly matches. They also played in the Campeonato Regional Centro (Central Regional Championship) and the Copa del Rey.

Friendlies

Competitions

Overview

Campeonato Regional Centro

League table

Matches

Copa del Rey

Quarterfinals

Notes

References

External links
Realmadrid.com Official Site
1919–20 Squad
1919–20 matches
1919–20 (Campeonato de Madrid)
International Friendlies of Real Madrid CF - Overview

Real Madrid
Real Madrid CF seasons